The Crow-Elkhart was an American automobile manufactured from 1909 until 1924 by the Crow-Elkhart Motor Company of Elkhart, Indiana, founded by Martin E. Crow.  The company manufactured both four and six cylinder models. After  World War I, Crow-Elkhart used Gray victory engines in some of its cars.

In 1922, the company went into receivership, and on June 22, 1923, the company's assets were sold for $78,000.

Models

Black Crow
From 1909 to 1911, the Black Motor Company of Chicago, Illinois, sold a rebadged Crow-Elkhart automobile as the "Black Crow".

Advertisements

See also
 List of defunct United States automobile manufacturers
 Brass Era car

References

Motor vehicle manufacturers based in Indiana
Defunct motor vehicle manufacturers of the United States
Brass Era vehicles
American companies established in 1909
Vehicle manufacturing companies established in 1909
Vehicle manufacturing companies disestablished in 1924
Companies based in Elkhart County, Indiana
1909 establishments in Indiana
1924 disestablishments in Indiana
Defunct companies based in Indiana